Terry Palmer (born February 20, 1952 in Cambridge, Massachusetts) is an American former alpine skier who competed in the 1972 Winter Olympics, where he ranked 16th in the men's slalom. He has three children.

External links
 sports-reference.com
 

1952 births
Living people
American male alpine skiers
Olympic alpine skiers of the United States
Alpine skiers at the 1972 Winter Olympics
Sportspeople from Cambridge, Massachusetts